Would I Lie to You? (abbreviated as WILTY) is a British comedy game show aired on BBC One, made by Zeppotron for the BBC. It was first broadcast on 16 June 2007, starring David Mitchell and Lee Mack as team captains. The show was originally presented by Angus Deayton, and since 2009 has been hosted by Rob Brydon.

Background
The show was presented by Angus Deayton in 2007 and 2008, with Rob Brydon (who had appeared as a guest panellist in the second series) taking over as host in 2009. The team captains are comedians David Mitchell and Lee Mack. As revealed by Lee Mack on Alan Carr: Chatty Man on 19 September 2014, Alan Carr was a team captain in the pilot but subsequently turned down an offer to appear on later shows. For each show, two celebrity guests join each of the team captains. The teams compete as each player reveals unusual facts and embarrassing personal tales for the evaluation of the opposing team. Some of these are true, some are not, and it is the panellists' task to decide which is which.

The first series was recorded at Fountain Studios in Wembley during March and April 2007 and aired at 21:55 between 16 June and 28 July 2007 on BBC One (missing a week for coverage of the Concert for Diana memorial event). Filming for the second series took place between 15 November and 18 December 2007. The second series was filmed at BBC Television Centre in White City, West London, because Fountain Studios were being used for The X Factor. The second series aired at 21:00 between 11 July 2008 and 29 August 2008 on BBC One, and contained eight shows, an increase of two from series one. A compilation episode featuring some previously unaired material was aired on 19 September 2008 at 21:30 on BBC One.

Filming of a third series of eight episodes took place at Pinewood Studios during March and April 2009, and was broadcast between 10 August 2009 and 29 September 2009 on BBC One at 22:35. A compilation episode was also recorded. The airdate was 17 December 2009, due to the addition of Match of the Day to the BBC One schedule. Filming of a fourth series of eight episodes took place at Pinewood Studios again during April and May 2010, and was broadcast between 23 July 2010 and 10 September 2010 on BBC One at 22:35. The compilation episode aired on 17 September 2010. The fifth series was filmed during March 2011 and started airing from 9 September at 21:30.

The sixth series of the show was recorded in March 2012 and began its broadcast on 13 April 2012. This series was aired in a pre-watershed slot, at 20:30, for the first time.
Series 16 is airing on Fridays at 20:00.

Format

Rounds

In all rounds, the scoring system is the same: teams gain a point for correctly guessing whether a statement is true or not, but if they guess incorrectly the opposing team gets a point.  Each episode running time is 30 minutes, so some questions are edited out prior to airing.  In addition, the comic format allows each team member to question and joke with the opposing team.  Hence, each episode has differing total scoring points reflecting the varying number of questions asked and answered.

During series one through series five, it was impossible for viewers to follow the scores until they were read out at the end of each round, as some questions were edited out, and the final scores reflected the total questions played while filming each episode (not reflecting the final edits for the 30 minute running time). However, starting with series six on, the scores were re-recorded to reflect what had made the aired edits and not the whole filmed recording.

The highest regular episode's total score is 22 points, series one, episode one, aired 16 June 2007, with a final score of 11-11, a draw between David's team and Lee's team. The earliest lowest regular episode's total score is 4 points, series seven, episode four, aired 24 May 2013, with a final score of 3-1, a win for David's team against Lee's team — since then, few more episodes also have a final score of 4 points. (The lowest score ever is the Children in Need Special's total score of 2 points, aired 18 November 2016, with a final score of 1-1, a draw between David's team and Lee's team.)

Current rounds

"Home Truths": Panellists read out a statement about themselves. The opposing team has to decide whether it is true or false by asking the panellist questions. The first series used all six panellists; from the second series onwards, the round tended to focus on the four guests. In series two a 'possessions' element was introduced, in which the panellist takes an item out of a box and reads a statement from a card, and has to convince the opposing team that the possession genuinely belongs to them.
"This is My...": A guest comes onto the set and is introduced by first name, but remains standing in silence as the round continues. Panellists on one team tell the opposing team about their relationship to the guest; only one account out of three told is genuine, and the opposing team has to work out which it is. At the end of the round, the guest reveals their true identity, and which of the panellists they have a genuine relationship with. On at least two occasions the guest has been a dog, which led on one occasion David Mitchell complaining tongue-in-cheek that doing so "rather spoiled the nature of the game". 
"Quick-Fire Lies": The second questioning round, with the panellists chosen at random. In earlier series, the panellists were ostensibly under a time limit although no on-screen indicator of the time limit was ever present. The notion of a time limit was eventually dropped in the later series, making the round identical to  "Home Truths" in practice. This round usually features – but is not exclusive to – Mitchell and Mack. From the fourth series onwards, Brydon also became an occasional participant, with both teams questioning him at once.

Former rounds

"Ring of Truth": A celebrity fact is read out by the host, and each team has to reach a joint decision on whether it is true or false. This round was generally edited out of the fourth series; as of series five, it is no longer being played.
"Telly Tales": Clips from a TV show are shown, a statement is read out about the show by a member of one team and the other team has to guess whether it is true or false. This round was only played in the first series.

Cast

Guest appearances
The following have all appeared multiple times as one of the guest panelists on the show, including any as-yet unbroadcast episodes of Series 16 (not including the 2011 Comic Relief special).

11 appearances
Bob Mortimer

10 appearances
Richard Osman

9 appearances
Jo Brand
Rhod Gilbert

7 appearances
Jason Manford
Claudia Winkleman

6 appearances
Miles Jupp
Gabby Logan
Henning Wehn

5 appearances
Greg Davies
Miranda Hart
Stephen Mangan
Sarah Millican

4 appearances
Jimmy Carr
Mel Giedroyc
Alex Jones
Chris McCausland
Dara Ó Briain
Sara Pascoe
Jon Richardson
Josh Widdicombe

3 appearances
James Acaster
Clare Balding
Frankie Boyle
Hugh Dennis
Russell Howard
Joe Lycett
Jack Whitehall

a.  Including an appearance where he substituted for Lee Mack as captain

Ratings

The first show of Series 1 had 3.8 million viewers, a 19% audience share at the time it was broadcast.

The first show of Series 2 had 3 million viewers and a 14% audience share. Later episodes indicated ratings of 2.7 - 3.2 million, with the final show of the series getting 3.3 million viewers and a 15% audience share.

The first show of Series 3 had 2.8 million viewers, the lowest number for a series opener so far; however, this equated to a 17% audience share. The final show attracted only 2.5 million viewers, but with a 19% audience share overall.

The first show of series 4 had 3.12 million viewers and a 19.7% audience share, the best performance for a series opener since series 1.

The series 5 premiere had the show's highest ratings to date, with 4 million viewers and a 17.2% audience share.

Series 6 began with an audience share of 14.9% and peak viewing figures of 3.53 million. These figures were above the seventh series figures of 2.83 million / 12.8% audience share, although these rose to 3.17 million by the end of the series with a 14.7% share.

Awards and nominations

The show came second place in the British Comedy Guide's 2010 awards for the category "Best British TV Panel Show", losing out to QI. The following year, it won the same category. It also won the category in 2013, and also won the "Comedy of the Year 2013" award, making it the first non-scripted show to do so. It won the "Panel Show" category for the third time at the 2014 awards, and again in 2015, 2017, 2018, 2019  and 2020.

The show won the British Comedy Award for "Best British TV Panel Show" in 2010. It was nominated in the same category at the following year's ceremony, but lost to Shooting Stars. It won the award twice in a row at the 2013 and 2014 ceremonies.

The programme has been nominated for the BAFTA for Comedy and Comedy Entertainment Programme five times, but has yet to win. Mitchell and Mack were also both nominated for the Best Entertainment Performance award at the 2019 ceremony; Mack took home the prize. Mack received another nomination in the same category in 2020. Mitchell received another nomination in the same category in 2021.

International broadcasts
The show airs on ABC TV in Australia and TVNZ 2 in New Zealand and began screening on BBC UKTV in Australia and New Zealand from November 2014. It is available to stream on BritBox in the US and Canada.

Merchandise
A DVD of the complete fourth series was released in September 2011.
A board game based on the show was released in 2012.
 A DVD of the complete fifth series was released in October 2012.
 A DVD of the complete sixth series was released in October 2013.
 A book based on the series, Would I Lie to You? Presents the 100 Most Popular Lies of All Time, was published in October 2015. The publishers, Faber and Faber, have also ordered a second book.
Series 4 to 7 were released individually on DVD in Australia across July and August 2015.

Episodes

The coloured backgrounds denote the result of each of the series:

Series

Specials

Appearances in other media
An additional 10-minute feature, entitled "Mam, Would I Lie To You?" was broadcast on the ITV show Ant & Dec's Saturday Night Takeaway on 13 March 2021. This edition was hosted by Ant and Dec and featured a team of Lee Mack, Stephen Mulhern and Michelle Visage playing two rounds of a slightly altered "This is My..." where the panellists had to guess which of the three children was the child of an audience member by the story given. Zeppotron and the BBC were thanked in the programme's credits for use of the WILTY brand and format.

International versions
A New Zealand version of the show, presented by broadcaster Paul Henry, and featuring team captains Jesse Mulligan and Jon Bridges, began airing on TV3 in 2012. It followed the Rob Brydon era UK format very closely but was short lived.
The Czech version of this show was to be broadcast from January 2013 on ČT, a public television broadcaster.
The Malaysian version, Betul ke Bohong (English: Truth or Lie) is presented by AC Mizal and airs on Astro Warna.
A Swedish version, Tror du jag ljuger?, presented by Anna Mannheimer with team captains Johan Glans and Fredrik Lindström.
The Icelandic version, Satt eða logið? (English: Truth or lie?) first aired 2017 on Stöð 2. Originally presented by Logi Bergmann Eiðsson who was succeeded by Benedikt Valsson in the second season, team captains are Auðunn Blöndal and Katla Margét Þorgeirsdóttir.
The Slovak version, Klamal by som ti?, presented by singer/actor Filip Tůma and featuring Petra Polnišová and Zuzana Šebová, actresses, as team captains, began airing in March 2019 on Markíza.
A Dutch version called Sterke verhalen (English: Tall Tales) was broadcast by BNNVARA.
An Australian version of the show began broadcasting on Network 10 on 28 February 2022. It is presented by Chrissie Swan, with Chris Taylor and Frank Woodley as team captains. Taylor was replaced by Charlie Pickering in the second season.
An American version of the show premiered on The CW on April 9, 2022. Aasif Mandvi hosts this version, with Matt Walsh and Sabrina Jalees serving as the team captains. The network is also set to air seasons 14 and 15 of the UK version in the US to introduce the show's format to viewers.

See also
Call My Bluff had a similar format, choosing the truth between three word definitions rather than personal stories
Would You Believe? (game show), 1970s Australian TV series with a similar format
To Tell the Truth, American TV panel show

References

External links

Zeppotron Website - Show Details
Digital Spy - Angus Deayton Returns To The BBC
Endemol UK Announces show details

2007 British television series debuts
2000s British comedy television series
2010s British comedy television series
2020s British comedy television series
BBC panel games
BBC television comedy
British panel games
2000s British game shows
2010s British game shows
2020s British game shows
English-language television shows
Television series by Banijay
Television series by Zeppotron